The Blériot-SPAD S.38 was a French fighter aircraft developed in the early 1920s.

Design and development
The S.38 was a single-seat fighter plane of all-wood construction with canvas. The aircraft was intended to test a cable hook.

Specifications

See also

References

Fighter aircraft
Biplanes
1920s French fighter aircraft
S.38
Single-engined tractor aircraft
Aircraft first flown in 1920
Rotary-engined aircraft